Duy Tân University is a private research university in Da Nang, Vietnam. The name derives from the Modernisation Movement, or phong trào Duy Tân, of 1906–1908.

Programmes
DTU was established on 11 November 1994, under Decision No 666/TTg, signed by the Prime Minister of Vietnam. DTU offers academic programs that include a graduate two year master's degree, an undergraduate four to five year bachelor's degree, a Junior Technical College three year Associate bachelor's degree and Secondary Professional and Vocational Education two year diplomas.

Duy Tan University offers a wide range of academic programs. Through its 16 graduate courses, DTU has fueled the local labor market with a total of 45,000 graduates and postgraduates so far.
 
In addition, with the slogan: "Partnering with Giants", Duy Tan University has expanded partnerships with many well-known universities around the world. These include Carnegie Mellon University (CMU), one of the top four American universities in IT; Pennsylvania State University (PSU), one of the top fifty universities in Business Management and Hospitality and Tourism; and California State University, CSU Fullerton and Cal Poly, one of the top five American public universities in Civil Engineering and Architecture on the West Coast. 
 
By providing access to internationally standardized curricula, DTU has established programs to help students continue their studies abroad. More choices are now available for DTU students, such as the 2+2 program, the 1+1+2 program and the 3+1 program. In 2017, DTU partnered with Troy University and Keuka College in the US to offer students Onsite Study-Abroad programs in four disciplines: Business Administration, IT, Hotel Management and Financial Management. Students can now receive advanced education and graduate with internationally accredited degrees, without having to leave Vietnam.

Founding 
Le Cong Co, Le Phuoc Thuy and Nguyen Thi Loc met on 15 August 1992 to form a committee to campaign for the establishment of the "Private University of Central Vietnam." Le Cong Co was elected to head the committee.

Their mission included:
 Initiating administrative procedures and preparing legal documents, including the University Development Plan, University Operation Regulations and University Personnel Plan, for the establishment of the Council of University Founders.
 Implementing tasks, such as setting up the University Representative Office and preparing academic facilities for operation, once the University Establishment License was officially granted.
 Searching for candidates to join the Council of University Founders.

Faculty

Campus
Duy Tan University has six campuses; four are in the heart of Da Nang city with a total area of 12,000 m² (five campuses of 30 hectares). Situated halfway between the north and the south of Vietnam, DTU is accessible from Hanoi, Ho Chi Minh City (Sai Gon), and other regions of Vietnam by road, rail, and air.

 03 Quang Trung, Hai Chau District, Danang city: About 500 meters from the Han River, it was officially opened in March 2009, at a cost of 100 billion VND. This is one of the biggest educational facilities in Danang.
 137 Nguyen Van Linh, Thanh Khe District, Danang City: This is the first campus of Duy Tan University and was officially used in November 1997. The building has five floors with an area of 1,800 m2. It is in the planning phase of the Management Board to use it as a training center of Danang Technology Institute with the contributions of many leading Vietnamese professors around the world.
 254 Nguyen Van Linh, Thanh Khe District, Danang: First opened in September 2002, the building has 12 floors with a total of 5,000 m². It has offices of DTU departments, such as Business Administration, Accounting, the DTU International School, the DTU e-Learning Center, the NIIT Center, the Graphics Center, and the Study Abroad Center.
 209 Phan Thanh, Thanh Khe District, Danang City: With an area of more than 4,500 m², this campus was first put to use in September 2001. The building is mainly used for teaching, laboratory work and as administrative offices for the Informatics Center and the Olympia Foreign Language Center.
 South Hoa Khanh Precinct, Lien Chieu District, Danang City: Officially opened in January 2011, it is the largest Duy Tan University campus, with an area of 35,200 m². The campus is about 1.5 km from the Thanh Binh beach to the east and near the bus station to the south. Together with three lecture halls for 1,000 students, the campus has a series of laboratories for Architecture and Civil Engineering students.
 Hoa Cam Campus

International relations
Resolving its strategic objective of international collaboration, DTU has partnered with more than fifty universities worldwide, participated in many well-known international organizations and expand relationships with big international enterprises operating in Viet Nam. These lay a sound foundation for DTU to gain more and more impressive achievements in education and research.

– Collaboration to Exchange American Training Curricula

• In 2008, DTU collaborated with Carnegie Mellon University.

• In 2010, DTU partnered with Pennsylvania State University (PSU).

• In 2011, DTU collaborated with California State University, CSU Fullerton and Cal Poly, to implement the first and only advanced program in Architecture and Civil Engineering in Central Vietnam.

• In 2017, DTU signed an agreement with Purdue University to implement an advanced Electrical Engineering and Mechatronics program.
DTU has partnered with Keuka College in the US to offer students the On-Site Study-Abroad programs in Business Administration; and with Troy University to offer the programs in Hotel Management and IT.

– Participation in CDIO, P2A (Passage to ASEAN)

• In 2012, DTU became the official member of CDIO Initiative.

• In 2012, The Passage to ASEAN – P2A was founded by Rangsit University (Thailand), DTU, the National University of Laos, Norton University (Cambodia) and the Myanmar Computer Institute.

Academic achievements
Over the course of almost 25 years of operation and development, DTU students have achieved special academic accomplishments in their quest for knowledge and skill.

1. Best university in Information Technology.

2. The 2013, 2016 and 2017 CDIO Cups

3. The Asia – Pacific IDEERS Championship in 2014.

4. First prizes in the 2016 and 2017 National Microsoft Imagine Cup.

5. A win in the 2016 and 2017 National Go- Green- In – The – City.

6. Fourth place in the 2016 International Information Security Competition, held in Switzerland.

7. Dang Xuan Nam came first in the Loa Thanh Civil Engineering and Architecture Tournament in 2010.

8. Eight first prizes, seven second, fourteen third and seven consolation prizes in the National Student Festival of Architecture.

9. Nguyen Thu Quynh won a National award for Female Information Technology students in 2012.

10. The "January Star" Awards organized by the Vietnamese Student Association.

11. Ta Ba Thanh Huy won first prize in the 2008 National Informatics College Olympiads.

12. Many other awards in the National Mathematics, Informatics and Physics College Olympiads.

13. Big prizes in the 2014, 2016 and 2017 Computer Fireworks Competitions.

References

External links

Universities in Da Nang
Educational institutions established in 1994
1994 establishments in Vietnam